Micrurus boicora is a species of venomous snake in the family Elapidae. The species is endemic to Brazil.

Geographic range
M. boicora is known from southern Rondônia and northern Mato Grosso, Brazil.

Taxonomy
M. boicora is a member of the Micrurus hemprichii species complex.

Description
M. boicora can be distinguished from its congeners by its dark dorsal coloration, thin white rings, a reddish ring around the neck, and bright orange-red on the tail. Its ventral coloration is dark with white splotches and a reddish gular area.

References

External links

Micrurus
Snakes of South America
Reptiles of Brazil
Endemic fauna of Brazil
Reptiles described in 2018